The Geneva Home, at 2305 W. Berry Ave. in Littleton, Colorado, is a one-and-a-half-story Craftsman-style frame house. It was listed on the National Register of Historic Places in 1999.

In 1927 the International Geneva Association purchased the property of what is now the Geneva home. It was a working farm before it was bought in 1927. It was used as a recuperative care facility for hotel and restaurant workers. The City of Littleton bought the property in 1975, and it fell into disrepair for over 20 years while the building was used as storage and the city planned on demolishing it, until it was saved from demolition.

See also
National Register of Historic Places listings in Arapahoe County, Colorado

References

External links 
 History of Colorado
 The Geneva Lodge

Houses in Arapahoe County, Colorado
Historic districts on the National Register of Historic Places in Colorado
National Register of Historic Places in Arapahoe County, Colorado
Houses completed in 1927
Littleton, Colorado